Cityplaza is an office and shopping development, developed by Swire Properties, at 18 Taikoo Shing Road, Taikoo Shing, Hong Kong. It is adjacent to Taikoo Place, another office complex developed by Swire. 

The six-level shopping centre, connected to Tai Koo station, houses more than 170 shops, restaurants, a cinema, and an indoor ice rink.

In 2018, Swire Properties sold two of the office towers, previously Cityplaza 3 and 4, to Hengli Group and real estate investors Gaw Capital Partners. Two years later, Gaw Capital partnered with Schroder Pamfleet to buying the remaining office tower linked to the mall, Cityplaza 1.

History and development

Phase I
Cityplaza was completed in 1982. As there was still no MTR connection at the time, double decker buses were used as a free shuttle service when the Island Eastern Corridor expressway was finished in 1984.

There are six storeys in Phase I, with many locations having changed. The first phase also included an office tower called Mount Parker House which has since been demolished and replaced by the East Hotel.

The first floor used to be a Standard Chartered Bank with the remaining space for car parking, until 1987 when a major renovation saw the area converted into retail stores, including Marks & Spencer.

After the relocation of Wing On Department Stores, the former space was left unoccupied for over three years. Only in 1999 was it leased to Citysuper Log-On, and later fashion store Uniqlo.

Phase II
Phase II was completed in 1987. As there was a hole in the southwest corner of 2/F (opposite Cafe de Coral), one could see part of Whimsy's mini roller coaster ride, but this was filled after the latter's closing down in 1990. There were also large neon advertisements in the middle of Phase II, but these were removed after a big renovation in 2002 and 2014.

In January 2014, Phase II second floor underwent a large renovation by interior designers OPENUU, updated with new ceiling, signages, and standardized shop signages.

The old food court, including Burger King, Oliver's Super Sandwiches, Mario's, Fairwood, were originally situated next to the ice rink. It was closed in 2001 and replaced by the another food court on the 3rd floor, called Food Republic. In December 2016, a new food court, TREATS, opened in the original shop of Maxim's Palace. It provides bread, cheese sandwiches, fresh juices, Hong Kong style barbecued food & noodles, pasta, salad, sushi, sashimi and bento. Two restaurants, Cha Cha Room (dim sum) and Minh & Kok (Vietnamese food) are also situated inside TREATS.

Services 
Cityplaza has offered a three-hour free Wi-Fi access and 5G network coverage in the mall. Also, the mall provides two car parks, namely Cityplaza Carpark and Taikoo Shing Stage 10 Carpark.

Entertainment 
The shopping centre is host to the oldest & Hong Kong Island’s only ice skating rink named "Ice Palace". The full renovation and enhancement of the rink, amenities, restaurant and skate shop were completed in 2020..

The cinema, MOViE MOViE Cityplaza was opened in 2017, boasting 6 widescreen theatres, including “MOViEMAXX” and one luxurious VIP house “MM Moments”.

See also
 Ice rinks in Hong Kong
 One Island East
 Swire Hotels
 Taikoo Place

References

External links

 

1982 establishments in Hong Kong
Office buildings in Hong Kong
Quarry Bay
Shopping malls established in 1982
Shopping centres in Hong Kong
Swire Group